Louis Leplée (7 April 1883  – April 6, 1936) was a French nightclub owner who discovered the singer-songwriter and actress Édith Piaf, who was singing on a Paris street corner in 1935. Leplée starred Piaf at the popular Parisian nightspot Le Gerny's as "La Môme Piaf" (The Little Sparrow).

Leplée was murdered in his apartment in Paris, on 6 April 1936. Piaf was questioned extensively by the police before being cleared of wrongdoing. The case has never been solved, and there has been speculation and theories of mob involvement in Leplée's death.

In popular culture
He is portrayed by Gérard Depardieu in the 2007 film La Môme, also known as La Vie en Rose.

References

External links
 Little Sparrow web site

20th-century French businesspeople
1883 births
1936 deaths
Nightclub owners